The Axis Occupation of Monaco (11 November 1942 - 3 September 1944) was the Italian and German occupation of the Principality of Monaco during the Second World War. It began with the Invasion of Monaco on 11 of November 1942, by the Italians where they set up a puppet administration.

Monaco was trying to remain neutral during  the Second World War, though nevertheless, it was invaded by the Italians on the 11 of November 1942, letting the Italians set up a puppet administration on the principality. It remained that way until the 3rd of September 1943, when the Italians signed the Armistice with the Allies, leading German Troops to enter the borders of the Principality. The Germans began to deport Jewish citizens to concentration camps. The Germans persecuted 14% of the Jewish citizens in Monaco, killing 42 out of 300 total citizens.

Prince Louis II of Monaco used the Monégasque police to warn Jewish inhabitants that they were marked to be arrested by the Gestapo giving them time to escape. Many were able to escape due to the help of Louis II and the police.

With the German army retreating from Monaco due to the Allied advance from the west, an American Army Group liberated the Principality on the 3rd of September, 1944.

Aftermath 
On 27 August 2015, Prince Albert II of Monaco unveiled a monument dedicated to the Jewish people who were deported. The monument had the Jewish people's names carved into the memorial. It was chosen to be unveiled 73 years after the night the Jews were deported.

References 

1940s in Monaco
World War II